airBaltic, legally incorporated as AS Air Baltic Corporation, is the flag carrier of Latvia, with its head office on the grounds of Riga International Airport in Mārupe municipality near Riga. Its main hub is Riga, and it operates bases in Tallinn, Vilnius and Tampere.

History

Early history

Baltic International Airlines (BIA) was a Latvian and US joint venture company owned by SIA Baltic International Airlines whose main airport was Riga International Airport . It was founded in June 1992, after the US-based private company Baltic International USA (BIUSA) failed to buy a part of the state-owned Latvian national airline Latavio. In the joint venture, the Latvian government owned 60%, while BIUSA owned 40% of the property. After unsuccessful privatization attempts, Latavio was declared insolvent from October 1995. It was liquidated and the Latvian government together with the Latvian-US joint stock company Baltic International Airlines created a new national airline airBaltic.

The airline was established as Air Baltic on 28 August 1995 with the signing of a joint venture between Scandinavian Airlines (SAS) and the Latvian state. Operations started on 1 October 1995 with the arrival of the first Air Baltic aircraft, a Saab 340, at Riga, and that afternoon, the plane made the first passenger flight for Air Baltic.

In 1996, the airline's first Avro RJ70 was delivered; and Air Baltic joined the SAS frequent flier club as a partner. 1997 saw the opening of a cargo department and, in 1998, the airline's first Fokker 50 plane was delivered. The adopted livery was mainly white, with the name of the airline written in blue on the forward fuselage, the 'B' logo being heavily stylized in blue checks. The checker blue pattern was repeated on the aircraft tailfin.

In 1999, airBaltic became a joint stock company; it was previously a limited liability company. All of their Saab 340s were replaced by Fokker 50s. By September, the airline had begun operating under the European Aviation Operating Standards, or JAR ops. Air Baltic welcomed the new millennium by introducing new uniforms  and opening a cargo centre at Riga's airport. 

The first Boeing 737-500 joined the fleet in 2003, and on 1 June 2004, Air Baltic launched services from the Lithuanian capital, Vilnius, initially to five destinations. In October 2004, Air Baltic was rebranded as AirBaltic. Their present livery consists of an all-white fuselage and lime tailfin. AirBaltic.com is displayed on the forward upper fuselage, and the word "Baltic" is repeated in blue on the lower part of the tailfin. In December 2006, the first Boeing 737-300 joined the fleet and was configured with winglets. In July 2007, AirBaltic introduced an online check-in system. It was the first online check-in system in the Baltic states. In the spring of 2008, two long-haul Boeing 757s joined the existing AirBaltic fleet. On 10 March 2008, it was announced that in the next three years the airline would acquire new aircraft, experiencing the largest fleet expansion in the company's history. The new additions will be next generation De Havilland Dash 8-400 aircraft.

AirBaltic had strong links with SAS, which owned 47.2% of the airline, and operated frequent flights to SAS hubs in Copenhagen, Oslo and Stockholm. Some of AirBaltic's products and services are still shared with SAS, including co-ordinated timetabling and shared airport lounges. AirBaltic is not a member of any airline alliance but does have codeshare agreements in place with several Star Alliance member airlines and others.

AirBaltic had secondary hubs at Vilnius Airport and Tallinn Airport. The majority of the routes commenced from Tallinn were cancelled shortly after opening, leading to complaints from the Estonian Consumer Protection Department.

In January 2009, SAS sold its entire stake in the company (47.2% of the airline) to Baltijas aviācijas sistēmas Ltd (BAS) for 14 million lats. BAS was wholly owned by Bertolt Flick (President and CEO) until December 2010, when 50% of BAS shares were transferred to Taurus Asset Management Fund Limited, registered in the Bahamas.

Development since 2010
In August 2011, AirBaltic requested more than 60 million lats in capital as its losses continued to mount, and suffered speculation about its financial position and political scandals throughout 2011. In mid-September 2011, the company announced plans to lay off around half its employees and cancel around 700 flights a month to avoid possible grounding. The company also announced that a mystery investor was willing to pay 9.6 million euros for an additional 59,110 shares. On 4 October 2011, the plans were annulled in order to make the necessary investments in the airline's capital. The government of Latvia and BAS agreed to invest around 100 million lats in the airline's share capital in proportion to their stakes in AirBaltic. In connection with the agreement, Flick stepped down as long-term President and CEO of the airline. Martin Gauss, former CEO of Hungarian airline Malév, became the new CEO.

AirBaltic had made an announcement on 23 September 2010 that it would establish a new secondary hub at Oulu Airport. 

In early 2012, it was confirmed that Oulu hub plans were cancelled due to financial issues. The cost-cutting program, initiated by AirBaltic which aimed to return to profitability in 2014, scored better than planned results in 2012, by narrowing its losses to €27.2 million, from €121.5 in 2011.

The state's shareholding had been 99.8% since 30 November 2011, following the collapse of a bank linked with a finance package negotiated for the airline, but on 6 November 2015 it was reported that the Latvian Cabinet of Ministers had approved plans to sell 20% of airBaltic to German investor Ralf Dieter Montag-Girmes for €52 million and agreed to invest a further €80 million in the airline. The total of €132 million of fresh capital for the carrier is intended to spur its Horizon 2021 business plan and fleet modernisation. Following the closure of Air Lituanica and Estonian Air respectively in June and November 2015, it is alongside Nordica, one of two flag carriers in the Baltic countries.

The Bombardier CS300 delivery was much anticipated by airBaltic since this new aircraft type was originally planned to replace most of the airline's Boeing 737-300s and Boeing 737-500s and would replace all by 2020. The delivery of the CS300 happened on 29 November 2016, at 2 am ET. On 28 November, Bombardier and airBaltic held a ceremony in Mirabel, Quebec, Canada for the first delivery of the CS300. At 1:30 am, shortly before the scheduled departure, an oil leak from an engine was spotted. It delayed the departure, but at 2:23 am ET, the aircraft was now airBaltic's property. On board the inaugural flight, there were 18 people, including 6 pilots: 3 from Bombardier, and 3 from airBaltic. At 4:13 am ET, after a delay of over 2 hours, flight BT9801 took off en route to Stockholm. The airline received two CS300 in 2016 and expects to receive six in 2017, eight in 2018 and four more in 2020.

AirBaltic was looking for opportunities to replace its Q400 turboprop fleet, and Bombardier and Embraer were viewed as potential future aircraft suppliers, with possible deliveries of 14 new aircraft beginning in 2020.

On 26 September 2017, AirBaltic announced it would buy at least 14 additional CSeries aircraft from Bombardier before the end of 2018; it planned to switch to an all-CSeries fleet by the early 2020s. Additional orders by AirBaltic were announced by Bombardier on 28 May 2018 and included 30 CS300 with options and purchase rights for a further 30 CS300. Airbus purchased a 50.01% majority stake in the CSeries program in October 2017, with the deal closing in July 2018; the aircraft family was subsequently renamed the Airbus A220.

AirBaltic temporarily suspended operations on 17 March 2020 due to the coronavirus pandemic, and flights only restarted on a limited basis from 18 May 2020.

On 14 December 2021, AirBaltic announced that its first secondary hub outside of the Baltic countries will be founded in Tampere–Pirkkala Airport in May 2022.

In 2022, AirBaltic launched a NFT collection with benefits for the airBaltic Club loyalty program. 

In 2023, AirBaltic announced that it would be partnering with Starlink to provide free in-flight Wi-Fi in their routes, making it the first in Europe to provide free in-flight Wi-Fi. The service is expected to start being installed at some point in 2023.

Corporate affairs
The current head office at Riga Airport opened in 2016.

Ownership
airBaltic is a joint-stock company, with current shareholders (as of January 2022):

Business trends
The airline's full accounts have not always been published regularly; figures disclosed by AirBaltic via various publications are shown below (for years ending 31 December):

Destinations

airBaltic operates direct year-round and seasonal short-haul flights from Riga, Tallinn and Vilnius, mostly to metropolitan and leisure destinations within Europe. Though they do not operate long-haul flights, they codeshare with partners in all three airline alliances to allow through-ticketed long-haul flights.

Codeshare agreements
airBaltic has codeshare agreements with the following airlines:

 Aegean Airlines
 Air France
 Air Malta
 Air Serbia
 Austrian Airlines
 Azerbaijan Airlines
 Belavia
 British Airways
 Brussels Airlines
 Cyprus Airways
 Czech Airlines
 Emirates
 Etihad Airways
 Georgian Airways
 Iberia
 Icelandair
 ITA Airways
 KLM
 LOT Polish Airlines
 Lufthansa
 Scandinavian Airlines
 TAP Air Portugal
 TAROM
 Ukraine International Airlines
 Uzbekistan Airways

Fleet

Current fleet
, the airBaltic fleet consists of a single aircraft type:

Historical fleet

airBaltic formerly also operated the following types of aircraft:

Livery 
The original livery was painted on Avro RJ70s and had a white fuselage. The original airBaltic colour scheme, blue and white, was painted on the engines and the vertical stabiliser. The second-generation livery also had a lime green wingtip and vertical stabiliser; however the logo was changed to airBaltic.com and the word airBaltic was painted on the engines, which were in their original metallic colour.

Until December 2019, the livery consisted of a white fuselage and lime green vertical stabiliser, wingtips and engines. In December 2019, the rear fuselage below the vertical stabilizer was also painted in lime green, with the tail cone remained white. The logo, stylised 'airBaltic', is painted in dark blue on the fuselage across the windows and on the underside of the aircraft. This livery is mainly used on A220s.

In order to represent the three Baltic states, four of the A220s have been painted in a series of national flag liveries - one each for Estonia and Lithuania, two for Latvia.

Services

Frequent-flyer programme
The airline's frequent flyer programme is called airBaltic Club. Travellers can earn 'pins' and collect stamps while travelling and receive various rewards. There are three levels: Club level, Executive level and VIP level, each with different reward structures.  Previously the airline used the SAS EuroBonus frequent flyer programme,

In-flight services
On most flights, airBaltic offers a buy on board menu offering food and drinks for purchase.

Accidents
 A drunk airBaltic crew including a co-pilot at seven times legal alcohol limit stopped by the police in Oslo before a flight in 2015. The second officer was sentenced to six months' jail while the captain and flight attendants also faced proceedings after a tip-off stopped them from taking charge of flight from Norway.
 On 17 September 2016, an airBaltic de Havilland Dash 8-400, registered YL-BAI, performing flight BT-641, landed at Riga without its nose gear due to problems with the nose gear.
 On 6 December 2017, due to heavy winds and a slippery surface, an airBaltic Boeing 737-500 slid off a taxiway after landing in Moscow Sheremetyevo International Airport.
On 3 December 2021, due to heavy snowfall, an airBaltic Airbus A220-300 (YL-CSE) slid off the runway after the landing at Riga Airport from Stockholm (flight BT102).
 On 9 March 2023, due to heavy snowfall, an airBaltic Airbus A220-300 (YL-AAP) slid off the runway after the landing at Riga Airport from Paris (flight BT694).

References

External links 

 
 
 Interview With CEO Of airBaltic Martin Gauss

Airlines of Latvia
Airlines established in 1995
Latvian brands
Association of European Airlines
Airlines for Europe
Companies based in Riga
European Regions Airline Association
Government-owned airlines
SAS Group
Articles which contain graphical timelines
Latvian companies established in 1995